Linda Jones (December 14, 1944 – March 14, 1972) was an American soul singer with a strong gospel-influenced style who had the 1967 top 10 R&B hit single, "Hypnotized".

Biography
Jones was born in Newark, New Jersey, United States. She started singing in her family's gospel group, the Jones Singers at the age of six. Her first recording was "Lonely Teardrops" under the name of Linda Lane on Cub Records in 1963. She was found performing at a local club by songwriter Jerry Harris who introduced her to producer George Kerr. After unsuccessful singles on Atco Records in 1964 and Blue Cat Records the following year, Kerr took her to Warner Bros. Records' R&B subsidiary, Loma Records in 1967. The first Loma release proved to be her biggest success, the ballad, "Hypnotized" reached No. 4 on the Billboard R&B chart and No. 21 on the Hot 100. This proved to be the label's best-selling record and it was followed by two further hits, including "What've I Done (To Make You Mad)" (No. 8 R&B, No. 61 pop), and an album.

After Loma closed in late 1968, Jones had a final single on the main Warner label before joining Neptune Records, run by Philadelphia record producers, Kenny Gamble and Leon Huff. Two singles, both produced by Kerr, saw some R&B success before she signed for All Platinum subsidiary, Turbo Records, in New Jersey in 1971. A powerful revamped version of the former Jerry Butler and The Impressions hit, "For Your Precious Love" reached both the R&B (No. 15) and pop (No. 74) charts in 1972 and saw her career take off again. Reviewing her 1972 album, Your Precious Love, in Christgau's Record Guide: Rock Albums of the Seventies (1981), Robert Christgau wrote: "Jones isn't too long on artistry—she likes to dispense with formality and just start at the climax throwing her emotions and her high notes all over material like 'Dancing in the Street' and 'I Can't Make it Alone.' Pretty amazing, in its way, and definitely recommended to people who always get out of their cars to look at waterfalls and strange rock formations."

Shortly after the end of her national tour supporting the album, Jones died at her mother's home at the age of 27, while resting between matinee and evening shows at New York City's Apollo Theater in Harlem. She had been a diabetic for most of her life and slipped into a coma while sleeping.

Legacy
All Platinum put out three albums of previously issued and unreleased material after her death and in 2008 her daughter Terry Jones, along with Helen Bruner, produced an album entitled, "Soul Talkin" featuring her mother's vocals. One of the tracks, "Baby I Know" was nominated for a Grammy Award at the 51st Awards Ceremony in 2008.

On June 3, 2021, The Grammy Museum in Newark, New Jersey added artifacts of Jones to their New Jersey Legends Exhibit, which has been a feature since 2017, that includes Frank Sinatra, Dionne Warwick, The Sugar Hill Gang, The Rascals, Melba Moore, Naughty By Nature and others.

On December 14, 2021, The City of Newark, New Jersey honored Jones with renaming Sherman Avenue, the street she lived on, to Linda Jones Way. Her daughter Terry Jones and singer Helen Burner was in attendance to accept the honor. Producer George Kerr and recording artist's Freddie Jackson, Stuart Bascombe of Black Ivory, and Dolores Milligan of the band Skyy were also in attendance.

Discography

Albums

Compilation albums

Singles

See also
27 Club

References

External links
Loma Records Discography

Raising Her Voice a Little Higher: The Pain of Linda Jones

1944 births
1972 deaths
American soul singers
Deaths from diabetes
Musicians from Newark, New Jersey
20th-century American singers
Loma Records artists